Dučić is a Serbian surname and toponym. It may refer to:

Dučić, Mionica, Serbia
Jovan Dučić (1871–1943), Bosnian Serb poet, writer
Nićifor Dučić (1832–1900), Serbian Orthodox clergyman

See also
Dučice, Montenegro
Dučići, Bosnia and Herzegovina

Serbian surnames